Assignment is a South African political thriller, produced and written by László Bene and Sandi Schultz. It was directed and edited by Bene. Assignment was shot in 2014 in Johannesburg. It was shown in 2015 at various film festivals and was released in cinemas nationwide in South Africa on 26 February 2016, by Indigenous Film Distribution.

Synopsis 

Kathleen Jacobs, a renowned conflict journalist returns home after a near fatal-incident cutting short her assignment in the Congo. Her mission, while incomplete, is still a success; she uncovers what could lead to an incredible scoop. When Kat pitches the story to her editor, he turns her down - a strange decision for a man always on a quest for a headline. Kathleen, however, is determined to break the story; a decision that pits her against major political forces. When she refuses to back off despite numerous "incidents", Kat suddenly finds herself on the run, aided only by two ex's; her ex-husband and an ex-military consultant. What ensues is a cat-and-mouse chase that risks everything. Not only Kat's career and reputation are on the line, but also her life, as well as that of her family.

Cast

Release 

Official Selection - Durban International Film Festival
Official Selection - Los Angeles Cinefest
Official Selection - Lumiere Film Festival
Official Selection - Silver Dollar Film Festival

References

External links 

2015 films
English-language South African films
2010s English-language films